Daouda Amadou (born 2 October 2002) is a Cameroonian professional footballer who plays as a defender for Colorado Rapids 2.

References

External links

2002 births
Living people
Cameroonian footballers
Association football defenders
Cameroon youth international footballers
Footballers from Yaoundé
Colorado Rapids 2 players
MLS Next Pro players
Cameroonian expatriate sportspeople in the United States
Cameroonian expatriate footballers
Expatriate soccer players in the United States